Borboniella allomorpha is a species of moth of the family Tortricidae. It is found on Réunion island in the Indian Ocean.

The wingspan is 10–11 mm. Adults have been recorded on wing year-round.

The larvae feed on Antirhea borbonica, Aphloia theiformis and Hypericum lanceolatum.

References

Moths described in 1922
Borboniella